The world records in disability swimming are ratified by the International Paralympic Committee (IPC). These are the fastest performances in swimming events at meets sanctioned by the IPC.

This article lists the women's world records in long course competition. The International Paralympic Committee provides information on the current world records at their official site, though the times present sometimes differ from those provided elsewhere.

50m freestyle

100 m freestyle

200 m freestyle

400m freestyle

800 m freestyle

1500 m freestyle

50m backstroke

100m backstroke

200m backstroke

50m breaststroke

100m breaststroke

200m breaststroke

50m butterfly

100 m butterfly

200 m butterfly

150 m individual medley

200m individual medley

400m individual medley

Freestyle relays

Medley relays

See also
Men's long course
Mixed relay long course
Men's short course
Women's short course

References
General
IPC world records – Women long course 16 August 2022 updated
Specific

External links

International Paralympic Committee
IPC Swimming
IPC Swimming record page

World IPC